The 2019 World Judo Championships were held in Tokyo, Japan from 25 August to 1 September 2019.

Schedule
All times are local (UTC+9).

Medal summary

Medal table

Men's events

Women's events

Mixed events

Prize money
The sums written are per medalist, bringing the total prizes awarded to 798,000$ for the individual events and 200,000$ for the team event.

References

External links
 Official website 
 

 
World Championships
World Championships
Judo Championships
World Judo Championships
Judo Championships
judo
World Championships 2019
Judo World Championships
Judo World Championships
Judo